Love Is (stylized as Love Is ___) is an American drama television series created and produced by Mara Brock Akil and Salim Akil. Based on the Akils’ real-life relationship, the series follows a modern-day power couple in Black Hollywood balancing successful careers and family over three decades. The series premiered on June 19, 2018, on the Oprah Winfrey Network. On July 31, 2018, it was originally renewed for a second season, but on December 19, 2018, OWN reversed the decision and canceled the series after a woman accused Salim Akil of domestic violence in their extramarital affair, as well as copyright infringement by using her screenplay as the basis for the series.

Plot
In 2017, a Black power couple tell the story of how they found love in one another and of their rise to fame in Hollywood starting in the 1990s. When they meet, Nuri is a comedy sitcom staff writer who longs to work in drama and Yasir is an aspiring but out of work writer/director.

Cast and characters

Main
 Michele Weaver as Nuri Summers in the year 1997
 Will Catlett as Yasir Omar in the year 1997
 Wendy Davis as Nuri in the year 2017
 Clarke Peters as Yasir in the year 2017
 Idara Victor as Angela in the year 1997
 Tyrone Brown as Sean in the year 1997
 Yootha Wong-Loi-Sing as Ruby in the year 1997
 Kadeem Hardison as Norman in the year 1997

Recurring
 Tammy Townsend as Carol, the mother of Nuri 
 Loretta Devine as Betty, the mother of Yasir
 Tim Reid as Sean in 2017.
 Vanessa Bell Calloway as Angela in 2017
 Lucius Baston as Lionel Woods
 Tosin Morohunfola as Keith
 Michael King as Will
 Jef Holbrook as the Bookstore Manager
Robert Crayton as Big Bob

Episodes

Production

Development
The series originated under the title Documenting Love, a multi-camera comedy project at ABC with a pilot production commitment in August, 2016. The project, which did not go to production at ABC network, later was rewritten as a one-hour single-camera dramedy. On July 18, 2017, it was announced that the project, now titled Love Is, was ordered direct-to-series on Oprah Winfrey Network for airing in 2018.

Casting
On December 6, 2017, it was announced that newcomers Michele Weaver and Will Catlett would star as Nuri, a sitcom staff writer, and Yasir, a writer-director. On January 16, 2018, Idara Victor, Tyrone Brown, Kadeem Hardison, Yootha Wong-Loi-Sing, and Lana Young have been cast as series regulars. On February 15, 2018 Clarke Peters joined the cast as regular. On February 16, 2018, it was announced that Tammy Townsend, Loretta Devine, Tim Reid and Vanessa Bell Calloway have been tapped for recurring roles on the series.

On April 13, 2018, it was announced that Wendy Davis would replace Lana Young as Nuri in the year 2017.

Reception

Critical response
On the review aggregator website Rotten Tomatoes, the series has an approval rating of 80% based on 10 reviews, with an average rating of 6.7/10. Metacritic, which uses a weighted average, assigned a score of 66 out of 100 based on 6 critics, indicating "generally favorable reviews".

Ratings

References

External links 
 

2018 American television series debuts
2018 American television series endings
2010s American comedy-drama television series
English-language television shows
Oprah Winfrey Network original programming
Television shows filmed in Atlanta